Tanacetum ptarmiciflorum is a shrub with silvery leaves in the family Asteraceae. It is known as a decorative plant. It is commonly known as the silver lace bush, and its origin known to be in the Canary Islands. The species is endangered in the wild and is an attractive shrubby perennial. It is suited to dry climates.

References 

ptarmiciflorum